Pedreira do Avelino (Portuguese: Avelino's quarry) is a natural monument in Zambujal, Sesimbra, Portugal. The site contains an important set of dinosaur footprints from the Upper Jurassic (155 million years ago). It contains 5 tracks and 108 total footprints.

Footprints
There is also an incomplete track with predominance of handprints of sauropods from the upper Jurassic, the first of its kind in Portugal.

Origin and discovery
The tracks are preserved on a surface that about 155 million years ago was the muddy bottom of the shore of a coastal lagoon, likely fresh water. The same geological processes that led to the lifting and tilting of the layers with these footprints were also responsible for raising Serra da Arrábida.

The discovery of the footprints occurred in the 1980s, while a compact limestone extraction took place.

Visits
The deposit can be visited every day for free. A platform was installed on the site to observe the footprints and information panels for interpreting the site, which help to know the time in which they lived, curiosities and characteristics of the dinosaurs.

References

Paleontology in Portugal
Fossil trackways